Florina-Raluca Presadă (born 26 May 1978) is a Romanian activist and politician who is a Senator for Bucharest since 2016.

Biography 
Born in Bucharest, Presadă studied political science at the University of Bucharest, followed by a master's degree at the College of Europe in Bruges, Belgium. Between 2007 and 2016, she was a project coordinator at CeRe (Centrul de Resurse pentru Participare Publică, Resource Center for Public Participation), an NGO that encouraged public participation.

She was involved in public debates (for instance, she supports the municipalization of water in Bucharest), as well as protests such as the 2012 Romanian protests, and the 2013 Romanian protests against the Roșia Montană Project.

In the 2016 Romanian legislative election, she was the candidate for Bucharest of the Save Romania Union (USR), a progressive-liberal Romanian party.

Political positions

Transparence and public communication 

Presadă accuses the lack of transparence and she says she wants to change the way the Parliament communicates with the people, to remove the feeling of powerlessness felt when the public tries to interact with the decision process, as well as the disdain from the decision makers.

As part of the transparence of the Parliament, she supports publishing the nominal votes on the Parliament's website, as well as public meetings for the Parliamentary commissions and an annual activity report for MPs.

Social issues 

Presadă argues that there are many social issues which have been improperly (or not at all) addressed by the government. For instance, the government after school program for disadvantaged community (which could reduce the school dropout rate) was not properly funded and the government did not take necessary measures against domestic violence.

Presadă supports a new national housing law, to replace and harmonize the plethora of laws and regulations (both national and local) about social housing, emergency housing and other types of public housing. She uses the example of Vulturilor 50, a case in which some families were evicted by the landlords and who were not able to find any social housing in Bucharest.

LGBT rights 
In 2016, Presadă was among the 1,000 signatories of a letter in support of the LGBT community in Romania.

References 

1978 births
Politicians from Bucharest
Members of the Senate of Romania
University of Bucharest alumni
Romanian environmentalists
Romanian women's rights activists
Romanian human rights activists
Women human rights activists
Save Romania Union politicians
Living people